This is a list of campaigns personally led by Mehmed II or Sultan Mehmed the Conqueror (30 March 1432 – 3 May 1481) (Ottoman Turkish: محمد ثانى, Meḥmed-i s̠ānī; Turkish: II. Mehmet; also known as el-Fātiḥ, الفاتح, "the Conqueror" in Ottoman Turkish; in modern Turkish, Fatih Sultan Mehmet; also called Mahomet II in early modern Europe) was Sultan of the Ottoman Empire twice, first for a short time from 1444 to September 1446, and later from February 1451 to 1481. At the age of 21, he conquered Constantinople and brought an end to the Byzantine Empire, transforming the Ottoman state into an empire. Mehmed continued his conquests in Asia, with the Anatolian reunification, and in Europe, as far as Bosnia and Croatia. Mehmed II is regarded as a national hero in Turkey, and Istanbul's Fatih Sultan Mehmet Bridge is named after him.

List of campaigns

Mehmed's opponents

See also

 Mehmed the Conqueror
 Growth of the Ottoman Empire
 Index of Ottoman Empire-related articles
 List of Ottoman sieges and landings
 Outline of the Ottoman Empire

References

Further reading
History of the Ottoman Empire and Modern Turkey: Stanford Jay Shaw,Ezel Kural Shaw, 1977

Wars involving the Ottoman Empire
Mehmed the Conqueror
Ottoman Empire military-related lists
Ottoman Empire-related lists